In algebraic topology, a branch of mathematics, the (singular) homology of a topological space relative to a subspace is a construction in singular homology, for pairs of spaces. The relative homology is useful and important in several ways. Intuitively, it helps determine what part of an absolute homology group comes from which subspace.

Definition 
Given a subspace , one may form the short exact sequence

By definition, the th relative homology group of the pair of spaces  is

One says that relative homology is given by the relative cycles, chains whose boundaries are chains on A, modulo the relative boundaries (chains that are homologous to a chain on A, i.e., chains that would be boundaries, modulo A again).

Properties

The above short exact sequences specifying the relative chain groups gives rise to a chain complex of short exact sequences. An application of the snake lemma then yields a long exact sequence

It follows that , where  is a point in X, is the n-th reduced homology group of X. In other words,  for all . The connected component containing  becomes trivial in relative homology.

The excision theorem says that removing a sufficiently nice subset  leaves the relative homology groups  unchanged. Using the long exact sequence of pairs and the excision theorem, one can show that  is the same as the n-th reduced homology groups of the quotient space .

One can define the Euler characteristic for a pair  by

The exactness of the sequence implies that the Euler characteristic is additive, i.e., if , one has

Local homology 
The -th local homology group of a space  at a point , denoted

is defined to be the relative homology group .

Local homology of the cone CX at the origin 
One easy example of local homology is calculating the local homology of the cone (topology) of a space at the origin of the cone. Recall that the cone is defined as the quotient space

where  has the subspace topology. Then, the origin  is the equivalence class of points . Computing the local homology can then be done using the long exact sequence in homology

Because the cone of a space is contractible, the middle homology groups are all zero, giving the isomorphism

In algebraic geometry 
Note the previous construction can be proven in algebraic geometry using the affine cone of a projective variety  using Local cohomology.

Local homology of a point on a smooth manifold 
Another computation for local homology can be computed on a point  of a manifold . Then, let  be a compact neighborhood of  isomorphic to a closed disk  and let . Using the excision theorem there is an isomorphism of relative homology groups

hence the local homology of a point reduces to the local homology of a point in a closed ball . Because of the homotopy equivalence

and the fact

the only non-trivial part of the long exact sequence of the pair  is

Functoriality
Just as in absolute homology, continuous maps between spaces induce homomorphisms between relative homology groups. In fact, this map is exactly the induced map on homology groups, but it descends to the quotient.

Then there is an induced map  on the (absolute) chain groups. If , then . Let

be the natural projections which take elements to their equivalence classes in the quotient groups. Then the map  is a group homomorphism. Since , this map descends to the quotient, inducing a well-defined map  such that the following diagram commutes:

Chain maps induce homomorphisms between homology groups, so  induces a map  on the relative homology groups.

Examples
One important use of relative homology is the computation of the homology groups of quotient spaces . We can immediately use this fact to compute the homology of a sphere. We can realize  as the quotient of an n-disk by its boundary, i.e. . Applying the exact sequence of relative homology gives the following: 

Because the disk is contractible, we know its reduced homology groups vanish in all dimensions, so the above sequence collapses to the short exact sequence:

Therefore, we get isomorphisms . We can now proceed by induction to show that .

Another insightful geometric example is given by the relative homology of  where . Then we can use the long exact sequence

Using exactness of the sequence we can see that  contains a loop  counterclockwise around the origin. Since the cokernel of  fits into the exact sequence

One generator for the cokernel is the -chain  since its boundary map is

See also
Excision Theorem
Mayer–Vietoris sequence

Notes
i.e., the boundary  maps  to

References
 
 Joseph J. Rotman, An Introduction to Algebraic Topology, Springer-Verlag, 

Specific

Homology theory